The Philippine Research Reactor-1 (PRR-1) is a research reactor that is owned and maintained by the Philippine Nuclear Research Institute (PNRI) in Quezon City, Philippines. The PRR-1 is the first nuclear reactor and the only operating nuclear facility in the Philippines. The PRR-1 initially operated as a critical reactor from 1963 to 1988 and the facility became dormant for 34 years. A new subcritical reactor, the Subcritical Assembly for Training, Education, and Research (SATER), was setup within the facility which was first loaded with nuclear rods in June 2022.

History

The Philippine Research Reactor-1 was built under the Atoms for Peace nuclear research exchange program of the United States. The reactor which had its first criticality on August 26, 1963, was built by U.S. firm General Atomics and was originally a 1 MW MTR-type open pool general-purpose reactor. It was successfully operated from 1964 to 1984 and was utilized for training and research in nuclear science as well as for isotope production.

In 1984, the Philippine Atomic Energy Commission (PAEC; then name of the Philippine Nuclear Research Institute (PNRI) decided to convert and upgrade the reactor into a 3 MW TRIGA Mark III reactor. The converted reactor achieved criticality in April 1988. The converted PRR-1 TRIGA reactor used low-enriched uranium instead of highly enriched uranium. After its  conversion, technical  and  administrative  problems  rendered the  facility  inoperable,  which  resulted  in  its extended  shutdown. In 2005, it was initially decided that the reactor would be decommissioned.

The PNRI with the help of the International Atomic Energy Agency setup a new subcritical reactor with zero-power configuration, the Subcritical Assembly for Training, Education, and Research (SATER) facility. The SATER project was conceptualized in 2014, but actual work on it only began in 2017. After 34 years of the PRR-1 being left unused, the commissioning process of the SATER began when it was loaded with 44 nuclear rods on June 20, 2022. SATER is meant as a training reactor for research reactor operators, regulators and users. The SATER is expected to be fully operational by 2023.

Notes

See also

Bataan Nuclear Power Plant

References

Nuclear technology in the Philippines
Nuclear research reactors
Buildings and structures in Quezon City
1963 establishments in the Philippines